Mirmingeh (also Romanized as Mīrmingeh) is a village in Cheshmeh Kabud Rural District, in the Central District of Harsin County, Kermanshah Province, Iran. At the 2006 census, its population was 112, in 27 families.

References 

Populated places in Harsin County